The Basking Ridge White Oak Tree (also known as the Holy Oak and Old Oak Tree) was a white oak that stood in the churchyard of the Presbyterian Church in Basking Ridge, New Jersey, United States. The tree was over 600 years old, and died in 2016, before being cut down in 2017. It stood at 97 feet tall, and may have been the oldest white oak in the world.

History 
The Old Oak Tree was located in the historical graveyard of the Presbyterian Church in Basking Ridge.

English evangelist George Whitfield and American clergyman James Davenport preached under the tree on November 5, 1740, to a crowd of 3,000 in the First Great Awakening.

George Washington's troops were drilled on the village green, within view, and Washington picnicked under the tree with Lafayette. The 5,500 French troops of Jean-Baptiste Donatien de Vimeur marched by in 1781, on their route to Yorktown, Virginia and the decisive battle of the American Revolutionary War.

Description 

Nicknamed the "Holy Oak", the Basking Ridge White Oak Tree was 619 years old when it died in 2016. In its final years, its lower branches were supported by metal bars.

Death and cutting down 
In June 2016, the tree was "failing to thrive" and showed signs of distress as its upper parts failed to sprout leaves. By September 2016, the tree had died. The tree was cut down over a three-day period, with the work finished on April 26, 2017. A young white oak grown from an acorn of the old tree was planted in the churchyard.

The new biggest tree in New Jersey is identified as another white oak tree in the yard of the Sparta Historical Association of Sparta.

See also
 List of individual trees

References

External links 

 Bernards Township

Bernards Township, New Jersey
Pre-statehood history of New Jersey
Individual oak trees
Individual trees in New Jersey
2010s individual tree deaths